The third season of the American fictional drama television series ER first aired on September 26, 1996, and concluded on May 15, 1997.  The third season consists of 22 episodes.

Plot 
Early in the season, Susan Lewis leaves for Phoenix to live with her sister and niece. Before she leaves, Greene realizes his feelings for her and races against time to declare them. He makes it to Union Station just as she is boarding the train. He stops her and declares his love, begging her to stay. Susan leaves anyway, but not before kissing Mark and declaring, as the train pulls out of the station, that she loves him too. In the aftermath of her departure, Mark begins to fall into depression, develops a meaner attitude, and starts sleeping with County General nurse Chuny Marquez, although they soon break up. Towards the end of the season, he is viciously attacked in the ER bathroom, and the thug is never caught. Although some suspicions arise over former patients and families, his beating was no more than a random act of violence. He becomes increasingly paranoid about his personal safety and distances himself from friends and family.

Meanwhile, Doug and Carol draw closer, culminating in a kiss at the end of the season. Doug is said to be attending therapy throughout the season, although this is never shown on-screen. This is possibly due to one of his one night stands dying in the hospital just after they were together, and Doug questioning his actions. Carol considers going to medical school, but eventually decides that she loves her work as a nurse too much to change.

Carter, now an intern, continues to lock horns with Benton, especially over Benton's treatment of surgical intern Dennis Gant. This eventually results in Gant committing suicide by throwing himself in front of a train and despite the ER staff's best efforts, Gant eventually dies from his injuries, devastating Carter who begins blaming himself and Benton for not doing more to prevent Gant's suicide.

Benton also starts dating Carla Reece, who becomes pregnant and gives premature birth to his son at the end of the season. Weaver supports Jeanie, who is forced to reveal her HIV-status early in the season, when Mark gains unauthorized access to her medical records. While Jeanie struggles with her condition, she becomes involved with a doctor from the Infectious Diseases department, before reuniting with her ex-husband, Al.

Production
Original executive producers John Wells and Michael Crichton reprised their roles. Lydia Woodward joined them as a third executive producer having previously served as a co-executive producer since the first season. Mimi Leder did not return as a co-executive producer having moved into directing feature films. Carol Flint returned as a co-executive producer. Christopher Chulack returned to his role as director and producer and was promoted mid-season to fill Leder's position as director and co-executive producer. Paul Manning returned to his supervising producer post. Long-term crew member Wendy Spence Rosato returned as a co-producer. Neal Baer and Lance Gentile were promoted from their second season positions as executive story editors to co-producers for the third season. Gentile continued to act as the series medical consultant. Penny Adams joined the series as a co-producer mid-season. Finally Michael Hissrich joined the production team in the junior role of associate producer.

Wells, Woodward, Flint, and Manning continued to regularly write episodes, with each contributing to 10 or more episodes this season. Baer and Gentile also continued to regularly write episodes contributing to eight and four episodes respectively. Joe Sachs returned as technical adviser and wrote a further episode. Regular writer Tracey Stern also returned and contributed a further two episodes. Second season writer Belinda Casas Wells also returned and wrote a further two episodes. They were joined on the writing staff by Samantha Howard Corbin and Jason Cahill with three episodes each. Anne Kenney contributed to the story for a single episode. Barbara Hall wrote the teleplay for a single episode.

Chulack continued to regularly direct episodes and helmed a further four episodes in the third season. Richard Thorpe, Félix Enríquez Alcalá, and Rod Holcomb were all returning directors for the third season. Thorpe continued to act as a cinematographer on some episodes in addition to directing. Jonathan Kaplan joined the directing team as a regular and contributed three episodes to the season. Tom Moore and Paris Barclay also made their series debuts and directed two episodes each. The other new single episode directors were David Nutter, series editor Jacque Elaine Toberen, Perry Lang, Davis Guggenheim, and Michael Katleman.

Cast

Main cast
 Anthony Edwards as Dr. Mark Greene – Attending Physician
 George Clooney as Dr. Doug Ross – Pediatric Emergency Medicine Fellow
 Sherry Stringfield as Dr. Susan Lewis – Resident PGY-4 (episodes 1–8)
 Noah Wyle as Dr. John Carter – Surgical Intern PGY-1
 Julianna Margulies as Nurse Carol Hathaway – Nurse Manager
 Gloria Reuben as Jeanie Boulet – Physician Assistant
 Laura Innes as Dr. Kerry Weaver – Attending Physician
 Eriq La Salle as Dr. Peter Benton – Surgical Resident PGY-4

Supporting cast
Doctors and Medical students
 William H. Macy as Dr. David Morgenstern – Chief of Surgery and Emergency Medicine
 Sam Anderson as Dr. Jack Kayson – Chief of Cardiology
 Amy Aquino as Dr. Janet Coburn – Chief of Obstetrics and Gynecology
 John Aylward as Dr. Donald Anspaugh – Chief of Staff
 CCH Pounder as Dr. Angela Hicks – Surgical Attending Physician
 Glenne Headly as Dr. Abby Keaton – Pediatric Surgeon
 Maria Bello as Dr. Anna Del Amico – Pediatric Emergency Medicine Fellow
 Jorja Fox as Dr. Maggie Doyle – Intern PGY-1
 Omar Epps as Dr. Dennis Gant – Surgical Intern PGY-1
 Matthew Glave as Dr. Dale Edson – Surgical Intern PGY-1
 Iqbal Theba as Dr. Zagerby – Ophthalmologist
 Harry Lennix as Dr. Greg Fischer – From Infectious Diseases department
 Perry Anzilotti as Dr. Ed – Anesthesiologist 
 Don Perry as Dr. Sam Breedlove – Surgical Attending Physician
 Ted Rooney as Dr. Tabash – Neonatologist
 Jami Gertz as Dr. Nina Pomerantz – Psychiatrist
 Melissa Chan as Dr. Leung Joo Hua
 Dwier Brown as Dr. David Herlihy

Nurses
 Ellen Crawford as Nurse Lydia Wright
Conni Marie Brazelton as Nurse Conni Oligario
 Deezer D as Nurse Malik McGrath
 Laura Cerón as Nurse Chuny Marquez
 Yvette Freeman as Nurse Haleh Adams
 Lily Mariye as Nurse Lily Jarvik
 Vanessa Marquez as Nurse Wendy Goldman
 Jenny O'Hara as Temp Nurse Rhonda Sterling
 Dinah Lenney as Nurse Shirley
 Bellina Logan as Nurse Kit
Lucy Rodriguez as Nurse Bjerke
 Suzanne Carney as OR Nurse Janet

Staff, Paramedics and Officers
 Abraham Benrubi as Desk Clerk Jerry Markovic
 Kristin Minter as Desk Clerk Miranda "Randi" Fronczak
 Charles Noland as Desk Clerk E. Ray "E-Ray" Bozman
 Deborah May as Director of Nursing Mary Cain
 Erica Gimpel as Social Worker Adele Newman
 Skip Stellrecht as Chaplain Miller
Mike Genovese as Officer Al Grabarsky
 Ron Eldard as Paramedic Ray "Shep" Shepard
Emily Wagner as Paramedic Doris Pickman
 Montae Russell as Paramedic Dwight Zadro
Lyn Alicia Henderson as Paramedic Pamela Olbes
Brian Lester as Paramedic Brian Dumar
J.P. Hubbell as Paramedic Lars Audia
 Meg Thalken as Chopper EMT Dee McManus

Family
 Christine Harnos as Jennifer "Jenn" Greene
 Yvonne Zima as Rachel Greene
 Michael Beach as Al Boulet
 Khandi Alexander as Jackie Robbins
 Ving Rhames as Walter Robbins
 Lisa Nicole Carson as Carla Reece
 Rose Gregorio as Helen Hathaway

Guest stars
 Lawrence Tierney as Jack Johnson (Episode 3)
 John Diehl as Mr. Johnson's son (Episode 3)
 William Sanderson as Mr. Percy (Episode 7)
 Ewan McGregor as Duncan Stewart (Episode 15)
 Joe Torry as Chris Law
 Kirsten Dunst as Charlene "Charlie" Chiemingo
 Harry Shearer as John Symthe
 Julie Hagerty as Brenda Wilkerson
 Joe Lisi as Mr. Gunther
 Nan Martin as Mrs. Curwane
 Veronica Cartwright as Norma Houston
 Chad Lindberg as Jad Houtson
 Clea DuVall as Katie Reed

Episodes

References

External links 
 

1996 American television seasons
1997 American television seasons
ER (TV series) seasons